Juan Rodolfo Soto Mura (27 April 1937 – 11 December 2014) was a Chilean footballer and manager who played as a forward.

Club career
In 18 May 1957, Soto made his professional debut playing for Colo-Colo in a match versus Magallanes. At the match, he scored a goal and was nicknamed El Niño Gol (The Goal Child). In 1963 he moved to Rangers de Talca, becoming the Top Goalscorer of the club history after scoring 81 goals until 1967. In 1968, he played for Audax Italiano, making 16 appearances with 2 goals. He returned to Colo-Colo in 1969, making 118 appearances and scoring 88 goals adding both steps at the club. He ended his career playing for San Antonio Unido in the Segunda División.

International career
He played in 19 matches for the Chile national football team from 1957 to 1961, including non A-Class matches. He was also part of Chile's squad for the 1959 South American Championship that took place in Argentina.

Coaching career
Soto coached Deportes La Serena in the Primera División and Provincial Osorno in the Segunda División in 1981 and 1983, respectively. In addition, he coached a team of Puerto Montt city in the 1982 Campeonato Nacional Amateur (National Amateur Championship) and Chile U20 in the 1985 South American Championship.

Later, he made his home in Punta Arenas and coached amateur clubs such as Club Deportivo Salfa, CD Sokol Croata and Club Social y Deportivo Prat.

Honours

Club
Colo-Colo
 Primera División (1): 1960
 Copa Chile (1): 1958

San Antonio Unido
 Copa Isidro Corbinos (1):

Individual
 Copa Chile Top Goalscorer: 1959
 Chilean Footballer of the Year: 
 Copa Isidro Corbinos Top Goalscorer:

References

External links
 
 Juan Soto at PartidsdelaRoja 

1937 births
2014 deaths
Footballers from Santiago
Chilean footballers
Chile international footballers
Colo-Colo footballers
Rangers de Talca footballers
Audax Italiano footballers
San Antonio Unido footballers
Chilean Primera División players
Primera B de Chile players
Association football forwards
Chilean football managers
Chilean Primera División managers
Deportes La Serena managers
Primera B de Chile managers
Provincial Osorno managers
Chile national under-20 football team managers